SN 1999eu was a type IIP supernova that happened in NGC 1097, a barred spiral galaxy about 45 million light years away, in the constellation Fornax. It was discovered 5 November 1999, possibly three months after its initial brightening, and is unusually under-luminous for a type II supernova.

References

External links
 Light curves and spectra on the Open Supernova Catalog

Supernovae
SN 1999eu
Astronomical objects discovered in 1999